After the Congress (I) party secured a majority in 1980 Maharashtra legislative elections, A. R. Antulay was appointed Chief Minister. Antulay's administration continued until January 1982, when he resigned amidst corruption allegations. Till date, Antulay remains the state's only Muslim chief minister.

List of ministers
The Antulay ministry consisted of:

References

Indian National Congress
1980 in Indian politics
A
Cabinets established in 1980
Cabinets disestablished in 1982